Falcuna leonensis, the western marble, is a butterfly in the family Lycaenidae. It is found in Guinea, Sierra Leone, Liberia, Ivory Coast and Ghana. The habitat consists of primary and secondary forests.

References

Butterflies described in 1963
Poritiinae